Zoraida is a given name. Notable people with the given name include:

Zoraida Gómez (born 1985), Mexican actress
Zoraida Sambolin (born 1965), American television journalist
Zoraida Santiago (born 1952), Puerto Rican composer and singer
Zoraida Córdova (born 1987), Ecuadorian-American writer and editor

See also
 Zoraida (play), a 1779 work by the British writer William Hodson